Liomyrmex is a monotypic genus of ant in the subfamily Myrmicinae; the type species is L. gestroi. This genus is known to inhabit Southeast Asia (including Papua New Guinea), South Asia, and parts of Southern China. Individuals in this genus are blind and are known to live among termites in their chambers, but it is relatively unknown as to the purpose of such a relationship.

Species
 Liomyrmex gestroi (Emery, 1887)

References

External links

Myrmicinae
Ant genera